Maurice LaFrancis Bassett (April 26, 1931May 24, 1991) was a professional American football player. Bassett played fullback for three seasons for the Cleveland Browns.  He led the Browns in rushing his rookie year and serves as the namesake for the Cleveland Browns' Rookie of the Year award.  He attended Langston University and would go on to serve in the Navy before playing for the Browns.

References

1931 births
1991 deaths
American football fullbacks
Cleveland Browns players
Langston Lions football players
People from Chickasha, Oklahoma
Players of American football from Oklahoma
African-American players of American football
20th-century African-American sportspeople